Urban Bruun Jürgensen (5 August 1776 - 14 May 1830) was a Danish watchmaker. His company lived on and was called Jules Jürgensen after one of his two sons and is based in Switzerland.

Early life and education
Jürgensen was born on 5 August 1776 in Copenhagen, the son of royal watchmaker Jørgen Jørgensen (1745–1811) and Anne Leth Bruun (1755–1828). He attended Efterslægtens skole where his teachers included Edvard Storm and  Knud Lyhne Rahbek. Jürgensen was in the same time a watchmaker's apprentice in his father's workshop. Aged 20, he went on a five-year journey abroad with economic support from Fonden ad usus publicos and Det Reiersenske Fond. He spent one and a half year in Neuchâtel and half a year in Switzerland before continuing to Paris and then London. He then returned to Paris.

Career
Jürgensen  returned to Copenhagen in 1801. He was supposed to enter into a partnership with a French watchmaker, Etienne Magnin, who had been called to Denmark to construct the next chronometers for the shipping industry. These plans changed when watchmaker continued to Saint Petersburg and Jürgensen then joined his father's workshop. In 1804, he published Regler for Tidens nøjagtige Afmaaling ved Uhre. It was the following year published in an improved edition in French. It was followed by a German translation. In 1804, he was also awarded the Academy of Sciences' silver medal for a publication about mainsprings published in one of its journals. In 1705, he was awarded Landhusholdningsselskabet's large gold medal for a metal thermometer. In 1807, weakened by gard work and personal griefs (the death of several children), he left Copenhagen for Neuchâtel where he stayed for two and a half years. He brought an extensive collection of machines and instruments back to Denmark which was the largest of its kind in the country. He was accompanied by a team of Swiss watchmakers which replaced his poorly trained Danish employees. In Geneva, he had been able to study the art of perforating precious stones, a technique which had for many years been kept secret. Jürgensen  was also the first in Denmark to make cylindrical wheels in steel instead of brass.

Jürgensen   continued the workshop alone after his father's death in 1811. Over a twenty-year period, he only manufactured around fifty chronometers.

In 1815, he was elected for the Academy of Sciences. This was an unusual honour for a craftsman.

Personal life and legacy
 
He was engaged to Sophie Henriette (31 January 1780, Locle - 24 January 1852, Copenhagen) in Neuchâtel, and they were married on 12 May 1801 in Peseux. She was a daughter of watchmaker Jacques Frédéric Houriet (1743–1830) and Henriette Courvoisier (1753–88).

He died on 14 May 1830 and is buried at the French Reformed Church in Copenhagen.

Jürgensen's two sons, Jules-Frederik Jürgensen  and Louis Urban Jürgensen, continued the family tradition. Jules studied in Switzerland, while his brother Louis remained in charge of the workshop in Copenhagen. Victor Kullberg, who went on to be one of London's most famous clockmakers, worked for Louis in the late 1840s. The company was later called Jules Jurgensen.

In 2021 Finnish watchmaker Kari Voutilainen together with a group of investors acquired the Urban Jürgensen company and was appointed as its CEO.

References

External links

 
 Urban Jürgensen Collection

Danish watchmakers (people)
Danish clockmakers
19th-century Danish artisans
People from Copenhagen
1776 births
1830 deaths